Francesco De Rose (born 21 June 1987) is an Italian football player. He plays for  club Cesena.

Club career
De Rose began his career in 2005–2006 with the shirt of San Fili Calcio 1926, team of San Fili in the province of Cosenza. From the following season he moved to Cosenza, which at the time played the Serie D 2006-2007 . He remained in the team of his birth city until 2010, winning the promotion in the Lega Pro First Division 2009-2010 after the first place in the Lega Pro Second Division 2008–2009.

In January 2011 he was bought by Reggina, with whom he competed in the second part of the 2010-2011 Serie B championship and the entire 2011-2012 Serie B season. Just in 2010-2011 touches the promotion with the amaranth: in fact disputes the play-offs, but the team is eliminated from Novara; De Rose takes both semifinal challenges against the Piedmontese players.

In September 2012 he changed team once again, moving to Lecce (Lega Pro First Division 2012–2013) with the formula of the loan with the right of redemption. At the end of the season it is not redeemed by the Pugliese, thus returning to Reggina. Play only the first half of the 2013–14 season, since on January 20, 2014, returns to dress the shirt of Lecce, moving with the formula of the loan with the right of redemption. [6] At the end of the season, return to dress the shirt of amaranth.

On 28 August 2014 it passes to definitive title to the Barletta.

On 27 July 2015, after having been released because of the failure of the Pugliese club, he was hired by Matera. [8] On 1 June 2016 renews with the biancazzurra team until 2019.

On 17 July 2019 he returned to Reggina on a 2-year contract. After winning promotion on his first season back at Reggina and playing the first half of the 2020–21 Serie B season with the Calabrians, he left in January 2021 to join Serie C's Palermo. In the 2021–22 Serie C season, he captained the Rosanero into winning promotion to Serie B as playoff winners.

On 12 August 2022, De Rose left Palermo to join Serie C promotion hopefuls Cesena on a two-year contract, reuniting with his former manager Domenico Toscano.

Career statistics

Club

References

External links
 

1987 births
Sportspeople from Cosenza
Living people
Italian footballers
Association football midfielders
Cosenza Calcio 1914 players
Reggina 1914 players
U.S. Lecce players
A.S.D. Barletta 1922 players
Matera Calcio players
Casertana F.C. players
F.C. Südtirol players
Palermo F.C. players
Cesena F.C. players
Serie B players
Serie C players
Serie D players
Footballers from Calabria